Mark Beard (born 8 October 1974) is an English former professional footballer who played as a midfielder. He is head of coaching at  club Dorking Wanderers.

Beard began his career in the youth academy at Millwall in 1991. He signed his first professional contract in 1993, and made his first-team debut later that year. He spent two years at the club; scoring a goal against Arsenal in an FA Cup victory in January 1995. He was transferred to Sheffield United ahead of the 1995–96 season. In 1998, he joined Southend United, who he had also spent time on loan at in 1997. He played regularly for the Essex club over two spells, as well as spending time at Kingstonian. 

He moved to Spain to set up a youth academy for Spanish team UD San Pedro in 2004, eventually ending up as part of the playing squad. After two years in Spain, he returned to England to sign for Stevenage Borough, spending one year with the club and winning the FA Trophy as part of the first team to win a competitive cup final at the new Wembley Stadium in May 2007. Beard went on to spend time at AFC Wimbledon during the 2007–08 season, and the club were promoted to the Conference South via the play-offs during his time there. 

After retiring from playing, Beard made the transition into coaching and management; taking on the role of first-team manager at Haywards Heath Town, Tooting & Mitcham and Loxwood respectively. He combined his role at Loxwood alongside working in the academy at Brighton & Hove Albion, before he left the Surrey club in order to take up the under-18 academy coach role at Brighton on a full-time basis in May 2017. He remained in the academy role at Brighton for four years before being appointed assistant manager at Stockport County in July 2021. Beard was appointed head of coaching at Dorking Wanderers in November 2021.

Playing career

Millwall
Beard started his career with Millwall, joining the club's youth academy in 1991 "straight from school". He was captain of the youth team that won the FA Youth Cup, beating Sheffield Wednesday in the final. During his time at youth level, he also helped the team win the Southern Junior Cup, as well as finishing runners-up in the South East Counties league. After playing regularly in the youth team, Millwall manager Mick McCarthy gave Beard his first professional contract in 1993. He made his debut as an 18-year-old, playing in Millwall's 4–1 victory against Watford. Beard went on to make 18 appearances that season, scoring one goal. During the 1994–95 season, he was a regular in the first-team, with the highlight of his campaign coming when he scored in Millwall's 2–0 win over Arsenal in an FA Cup third round replay at Highbury in January 1995.

Sheffield United
In the summer of 1995, Beard was transferred to Sheffield United for a fee of £117,500, with Dave Bassett signing him. He made his debut as a substitute in a 2–0 loss to Tranmere Rovers in August 1995, and went on to make 56 appearances during his time at the club. At the start of the 1997–98 season, Beard was loaned out to Southend United for two months, making his debut in a 1–1 draw against Oldham Athletic. He went on to make ten appearances during the brief loan agreement. He returned to his parent club in January 1998, making four appearances during the second half of the campaign.

Southend United
Ahead of the 1998–99 season, Beard signed for Southend on a permanent basis. He was a regular during the season, making 40 appearances in all competitions, and earning the Player of the Year award at the end of the season. He remained at Southend for the 1999–2000 campaign, starting in the club's first game of the season, a 2–1 home win over Plymouth Argyle. He made 42 appearances during the season as Southend finished in 16th position in Division Three, scoring what turned out to be his only goal for the club in a 2–1 defeat to Hull City in November 1999. During his first spell at Southend, he made 82 appearances for the Essex club.

He then signed for Football Conference club Kingstonian on a free transfer in July 2000. He debuted for Kingtsonian in a 1–0 home victory over Northwich Victoria on 19 August 2000, and made 29 appearances for the club during a season in which Kingstonian were relegated. The club did reach the Fourth round of the FA Cup that season, losing to Bristol City in a replay after the two teams had drawn at Ashton Gate, with Beard playing in both matches. He left the club at the end of the season, and subsequently rejoined Southend United two months into the 2001–02 season, making 17 appearances that season. Another season at Southend followed, during which he made 42 appearances, before leaving the club at the end of the 2002–03 season. He returned to Kingstonian for the following season, with the club playing in the Isthmian League Premier Division, scoring six times in 40 league games. At the end of the season, he travelled to Spain to set up a youth academy at Marbella based club U.D San Pedro in the Spanish Third Division, and ended up as part of the playing squad during his time there.

Stevenage Borough
After a two-year spell both playing and coaching in Spain, Beard signed for Stevenage Borough of the Conference National on 11 September 2006. The move came about after Beard asked his brother, Matt Beard, to call a number of a managers in England. Stevenage manager Mark Stimson stated he was in need of "adding some grit into midfield", and subsequently offered Beard a one-week trial period to prove his fitness. Beard had previously played alongside Stimson at Southend. Beard agreed to play for nothing at the beginning of his time at Stevenage, making his debut in a 6–0 home victory over Stafford Rangers on 9 September 2006, coming on as a 73rd-minute substitute in the club's first win of the season. He scored his first goal in a 1–0 victory against Weymouth at Broadhall Way on 19 September 2006. Beard played regularly during the campaign, making 49 appearances in all competitions, scoring three goals. This appearance tally included eight appearances in the FA Trophy, with Beard playing every minute as Stevenage became the first team to win a competitive cup final at the new Wembley Stadium, beating Kidderminster Harriers 3–2 in-front of a competition record crowd of 53,262. He was released at the end of the season; Beard stated he was "gutted to leave", with Stimson wanting to bring in John Martin as his replacement.

Later career
Following his release from Stevenage, Beard joined Conference South club St Albans City in a player-assistant manager role on 20 June 2007. He was assistant to Ritchie Hanlon, who stated – "Mark has all the relevant coaching badges and I'm looking forward to working with him as he is someone I trust. He will bring experience to the team and is someone the other players can look up to". Hanlon was sacked just ten games into the 2007–08 season, and Beard subsequently departed too. He then signed for AFC Wimbledon of the Isthmian League Premier Division towards the latter stages of 2007, and he helped the team gain promotion to the Conference South, scoring once in 17 league appearances. He left Wimbledon at the end of the season, and then spent two years at Haywards Heath Town in the Sussex County League, making 56 appearances and scoring six times, as well as managing the club during the 2009–10 campaign. Following an injury crisis as manager of Tooting and Mitcham United, he briefly returned to playing during the 2010–11 season, scoring one goal in three games.

Managerial career

Early coaching career
Beard gained his UEFA coaching badges in 2007, and already had previous experience of coaching in both Spain and Cyprus. He was appointed Director of Youth at Spanish Third Division club UD San Pedro, combining the position with his playing duties. With the aid of Vinny Samways, Beard watched over seven academy teams before returning to the England when he signed for Stevenage Borough. He was brought in to set up a youth academy at Sussex County League club Haywards Heath Town in 2008, and ultimately ended up managing the side during the 2009–10 season.

He was appointed manager of Isthmian Premier Division team Tooting and Mitcham United in July 2010, spending 18-months in-charge, describing his tenure as "a great experience which will stand me in good stead for my future as a coach/manager". He left the club in December 2011, stating – "It was on the cards for the last couple of months. It is down to the results, they haven't been good enough and for one reason or another we have not been winning games. It has been a struggle. Last season, we didn't have a lot of money and we worked hard with a whole lot of youngsters and, this year, too many things have been going on behind the scenes and affecting things on the pitch".

Management
Beard was appointed as youth team coach at League One club Crawley Town in February 2012. He spent two years coaching in the youth set-up at Crawley, before starting up his own academy in 2014, creating the Love The Ball (LTB) Sussex Academy. The LTB Sussex Academy joined together with Southern Combination Premier Division club Loxwood ahead of the 2014–15 season, providing a direct route for academy players to play first-team semi-professional football. After a year serving as head coach at the LTB Sussex Academy, Beard took over as manager of the Loxwood first-team in 2015. Half of his academy players were subsequently promoted to the Loxwood first-team.

Brighton & Hove Albion
He combined the role of first-team manager at Loxwood alongside coaching the under-15 and under-16 teams at Brighton & Hove Albion. In March 2017, Beard left his role at Loxwood with immediate effect, due to a change in coaching responsibilities at Brighton. Two months later, in May 2017, he was promoted to under-18 academy coach at Brighton. Brighton's under-17 team won the under-17 Premier League Cup under Beard's management, winning the final 2–0 against the under-17 team of Middlesbrough on 5 May 2021.

Stockport County
After four years in his under-18 academy coach role at Brighton, Beard was appointed assistant manager at National League club Stockport County on 6 July 2021. He left his role at Stockport in October 2021, having struggled to relocate away from his family.

Dorking Wanderers
Beard was appointed as head of coaching at National League South club Dorking Wanderers on 12 November 2021.

Personal life
Beard was born in Roehampton. He is a Millwall supporter. His son Sam Beard is currently playing for Barnet FC.

Honours
Millwall
FA Youth Cup: 1990–91

Stevenage Borough
FA Trophy: 2006–07

AFC Wimbledon
Isthmian League Premier Division play-offs: 2007–08

Individual
 Southend United Player of the Year: 1998–99

References

External links

1974 births
Living people
Footballers from Roehampton
English footballers
Association football defenders
Millwall F.C. players
Sheffield United F.C. players
Southend United F.C. players
Kingstonian F.C. players
UD San Pedro players
Stevenage F.C. players
AFC Wimbledon players
Haywards Heath Town F.C. players
Tooting & Mitcham United F.C. players
English Football League players
National League (English football) players
Isthmian League players
English football managers
Haywards Heath Town F.C. managers
Tooting & Mitcham United F.C. managers
Loxwood F.C. managers
Brighton & Hove Albion F.C. non-playing staff